The Oman Football Association is the governing body of football in Oman.  It was founded in 1978, has been a member of the Asian Football Confederation and of FIFA since 1980.

History

The first football club of the Sultanate (documented as such)  was the Maqboul Club, founded in 1942, known today as the Oman Club. In the 1970s, Qaboos bin Said al Said favored the development of sports events and associations, which led in 1978 to the creation of the Omani Football Association with Sayyid / Haitham bin Tariq Al Said (Minister of National Heritage and Culture and in 2020, the successor to Qaboos as Sultan) as its first president. In its first year of operations, the Association became a member of the Union of Arab Football Associations and of the FIFA, and then joined the Asian Football Federation in 1980.

In November 2017, the OFA was chosen to organize the FIFA Executive Football Summit scheduled for February 2018.

Association staff

Description
Oman has a total of 45 clubs divided into three divisions. The First Division has 12 clubs, Second Division has 13 clubs while the Third Division has 20 clubs.

Oman is looking to take advantage of FIFA's assistance in the GOAL project to further develop the game in Oman. 

The Association is 70%-financed by the government through the Ministry of Sports Affairs (2010).

Individual awards

Team awards and achievements

Omani League teams 2010-11

See also
Oman Professional League - National football league of Oman

Sultan Qaboos Cup - National cup of Oman

Oman Professional League Cup - League cup of Oman

References

External links
 Official website
 Organizational effectiveness: The case of Oman Football Association, thesis hosted on the Ottawa University website

Football in Oman
Football
Sports organizations established in 1978
Oman